Extended Play Live is a live EP released by Mudcrutch in November 2008 on Reprise Records. It was recorded during the band's 2008 tour to promote their first album Mudcrutch. The EP was released on CD and vinyl.

Track listing 
All songs were written by Tom Petty, except where noted.
 "The Wrong Thing to Do" – 4:46
 "Bootleg Flyer" (Petty, Mike Campbell) – 4:01
 "Crystal River" – 15:00
 "High School Confidential" (Ron Hargrave, Jerry Lee Lewis) – 4:01

 Tracks 1 and 2 recorded April 20, 2008, at the Ventura Theatre, Ventura, California.
 Track 3 recorded April 28, 2008, at The Troubadour, West Hollywood, California.
 Track 4 recorded May 2, 2008, at The Troubadour, West Hollywood, California.

Personnel 
Tom Petty – bass guitar, vocals
Mike Campbell – guitar, mandolin
Tom Leadon – acoustic guitar, vocals
Benmont Tench – organ, piano, vocals
Randall Marsh – drums

Other personnel 
Dennis Callahan – photography
Ryan Corey – design
Kevin Scanlon – cover photo
Ryan Ulyate – engineer, mixing

References

External links 
 Mudcrutch website

Albums produced by Tom Petty
2008 EPs
Mudcrutch albums
Live EPs
Reprise Records live albums
2008 live albums
Reprise Records EPs